Kearsarge Regional High School (KRHS) is a public high school in North Sutton, New Hampshire, United States. It is part of the Kearsarge Regional School District SAU 65, and serves students from the towns of Bradford, Warner, Sutton, New London, Newbury, Springfield  and Wilmot.

Sports at the high school include softball, baseball, soccer, football, cross country, track, field hockey, lacrosse, rugby, golf, tennis, basketball, swimming, ice hockey, cheerleading, Nordic and alpine skiing, wrestling, lacrosse, dance team, and a new volleyball team. The school colors are royal blue and gold, and the mascot is a cougar.

References

External links 
 

Sutton, New Hampshire
Schools in Merrimack County, New Hampshire
Public high schools in New Hampshire